Gambling on papal elections has at least a 500-year history. Betting on 16th-century papal conclaves are among the first documented examples of gambling on election outcomes. During the same period, gambling was also common on the outcomes of secular Italian elections, such as that of the Doge of Venice.

15th century
The Republic of Venice forbade betting on the pope's life in 1419, and canceled bets already made. Life insurance policies were often taken out on the current pope, sometimes as genuine insurance by businessmen owed money by the papacy who feared a change of Pontiff, but also a purely speculative venture.  Such policies on the lives of popes and other notable figures were forbidden in Barcelona (1435) and Genoa (1467 and 1494).

16th century
The first recorded example of gambling on the candidate to be selected by a papal election occurs with the papal conclave, September 1503, although Frederic Baumgartner, a historian of papal elections, considers it then already "an old practice".

Discussing the election of Leo X in 1513, it has been stated:	
Betting on the outcome of papal elections was quite common and was often handled by the banking houses in Rome which employed sensali, or messengers, to scurry back and forth delevering betting slips. Bettors watched the odds closely.

Before and during the papal conclave 1549–1550, many Roman bankers offered betting spreads on the papabili (cardinals likely to be elected). According to the Venetian Enrico Dandolo, a witness to the conclave, "it is more than clear that the merchants are very well informed about the state of the poll, and that the cardinals' attendants in Conclave go partners with them in wagers, which thus causes many tens of thousands of crowns to change hands". Dandolo describes an early example of insider trading. Cardinal del Monte (who was eventually elected Julius III) had eventually started out as the favorite at 5-1, trailed by Salviati, Ridolfi, and Pole, but Pole was the favorite three days later at 4-1. By December 5, Pole's odds had shortened to 100-95. With the arrival of four additional French cardinals on December 11, Pole's odds drifted to 5-2. On January 22, the odds quoted against the conclave finishing during January were 10-9, against February: 2-1, against March: 5-1, and never: 10-1.

In March 1591, Pope Gregory XIV imposed a penalty of excommunication against any who wagered on the outcome or length of papal elections (as well as the creation of cardinals), and banned the practice in the Papal States.  The canon was abrogated (along with the rest of existing canon law) by Pope Benedict XV's reforms

19th century
According to a New York Times article following the papal conclave, 1878: "The Italians are all superstitious, and all fond of the lottery. Every great event leads to speculation in numbers. The deaths and advents of the Popes has always given rise to an excessive amount of gambling in the lottery, and today the people of Italy are in a state of excitement that is indescribable.  Figures are picked out which have some relation with the life or death of Pius IX.  Every day large sums are paid for tickets in the lottery about to be drawn."

20th century
Gambling over the outcomes of the papal conclave, 1903 and papal conclave, 1922 was covered in several newspapers. With the 1903 conclave, the Italian government-run lottery offered odds on the pope's death and, had Pope Leo XIII died a week earlier, the government would have lost over $1,000,000.

There was extensive betting in Britain over the elections of Pope John Paul I and Pope John Paul II, and the English Catholic primate, the Archbishop of Westminster felt it necessary to forbid participation by Catholics.

21st century
Paddy Power, Ireland's largest bookmaker, started taking bets on the successor of Pope John Paul II five years before the pontiff's death. British bookmakers such as Pinnacle Sports and William Hill plc also offered such bets, with significantly different odds. Cardinal Ratzinger, the eventual choice of the papal conclave, 2005 as Pope Benedict XVI, started out with 12-1 odds, but was a 3-1 favorite at the time of the conclave. Mr. Power, the proprietor of Paddy Power, was evicted from St. Peter's Square by security staff before the start of the 2005 conclave for displaying his betting prices, by what he claims were undercover police officers. Paddy Power alone took over $382,000 in bets on the conclave, making it—according to Mr. Power—"the biggest non-sports betting market of all time". 
With Pope Benedict XVI's resignation on February 28, 2013, Paddy Power's website for Papal conclave, 2013 lists the current successors to Pope Benedict XVI. On March 13, 2013, Jorge Mario Bergoglio was elected Pope Francis. Prior to Pope Francis' election, the odds were 25-to-1 of Bergoglio becoming pope, according to betting company William Hill Plc. Paddy Power's website also posted 25-to-1 odds shortly before Pope Francis' election.

Gambling on Papal conclaves is largely internet based, as most conventional sport books, such as those in Las Vegas, do not accept bets on election outcomes. A handicapper for Bally's and Paris Las Vegas said the casinos refused to accept bets on the election because of "taste" concerns. The practice is illegal in the United States under the Federal Wire Act of 1961.

Wagering on the Papal conclaves may no longer be considered illegal in the United States. On September 20, 2011, the United States Justice Department reversed its opinion that all forms of internet gambling are in violation of the Federal Wire Act. The ruling states that the prohibition in the Wire Act of using interstate communications for gambling applies only to betting on a "sporting event or contest." Intrastate betting on the papal conclave may now be legal. However, interstate policy has yet to be determined.

Gregory XIV's bull of excommunication as a penalty for such wagers was never specifically rescinded, but was abrogated along with all canon law provisions associated with the Ius Decretalium in 1918.

Notes

References
Baumgartner, Frederic J. 1985. "Henry II and the Papal Conclave of 1549." Sixteenth Century Journal. 16, 3: 301–314.
Baumgartner, Frederic J.  2003. Behind Locked Doors: A History of Papal Elections. New York: Palgrave.
Clark, Geoffrey Wilson; Betting on lives: the culture of life insurance in England, 1695-1775, Manchester University Press ND, 1999, 

Election of the Pope
Gambling and society